Alexander Gregorieff Ketzko (November 19, 1919 – December 23, 1944) was an American football player.

A native of Chicago, he moved with his family to Mattawan, Michigan as a boy. He played college football for Michigan State College (later known as Michigan State University) in 1938 and 1939. In July 1940, he signed to play professional football for the Paterson Panthers of the American Professional Football Association. He signed with the National Football League's New York Giants before being traded to the Detroit Lions. He appeared in nine games during his rookie year of 1943. During the season, he attended a military draft ceremony but remained with the Lions until the end of the year.

Upon being inducted into the United States Army, he was deployed to Europe in May 1944 with the 15th Infantry Regiment, 3rd Division, 7th Army. Private First Class Ketzko was killed in action in the Battle of the Bulge in December at age 25.

References

1919 births
1944 deaths
American football tackles
Michigan State Spartans football players
Detroit Lions players
Players of American football from Chicago
People from Mattawan, Michigan
United States Army personnel killed in World War II
United States Army soldiers